Sunil Kumar Jakhar (born 9 February 1954) is an Indian politician and member of Bharatiya Janata Party, who was formerly president of Punjab Pradesh Congress Committee (2017- 2021). Elected consecutively three times from Abohar, Punjab constituency (2002-2017), he was a Leader of opposition in Punjab Vidhan Sabha from 2012-2017. He was a member of the Indian National Congress (INC) for five decades until 2022. In May, 2022, he joined the Bharatiya Janata Party (BJP) claiming that he wanted to support "nationalism, unity and brotherhood in Punjab". Earlier, Jakhar was elected as a Member of Parliament from Gurdaspur, Punjab to the Lok Sabha, the lower house of Indian parliament in a by-election in 2017.

Early life and background
Jakhar was born on 9th February 1954 in Panjkosi village of Fazilka district in Punjab and his family belongs to Hindu Jat community. His father was Balram Jakhar, a prominent Indian politician of the Congress party, who served as the Speaker of the Lok Sabha and founded the Bharatiya Krishak Samaj, a farmers' organization. Sunil Jakhar is the youngest of his father's three sons. Jakhar's eldest brother, Sajjan Kumar Jakhar served as a minister in the Beant Singh's Punjab government (1992-1995). His other brother, Surinder Jakhar, served as chairman IFFCO for four terms before his accidental death in 2011.

Sunil Jakhar obtained a bachelors BA degree from the Government College, Chandigarh; and did his post graduate MBA program from Kurukshetra University.

Political career
Jakhar first became a member of Punjab Vidhan Sabha from Abohar in 2002. In 2007 and 2012, he was re-elected from Abohar.
he became member of parliament after winning a by-election in Gurdaspur. He left the Indian National Congress on 14th May, days after receiving a notice from Congress High-Command. He joined the Bharatiya Janata Party on 19 May 2022 at Delhi.

According to some political analysts, Sunil Jakhar’s strengths are related to his ‘clean-image’, articulate approach, and polite attitude.

Controversy
On 7 January 2017, Jakhar sent a complaint to the Punjab chief election officer alleging that local Shiromani Akali Dal leader Shivlal Doda and his nephew Waris / others used seven different mobile numbers while in a Fazilka prison.

References

 

State cabinet ministers of Punjab, India
Living people
Punjab, India MLAs 2002–2007
Punjab, India MLAs 2007–2012
Punjab, India MLAs 2012–2017
People from Fazilka district
India MPs 2014–2019
Former members of Indian National Congress from Punjab
Leaders of the Opposition in Punjab, India
Lok Sabha members from Punjab, India
People from Gurdaspur district
1954 births
Bharatiya Janata Party politicians from Punjab